Radio Sessions '83–'84 (1988) is a compilation album by British rock band, New Model Army.

The tracks on the album are from the band's sessions for BBC Radio. The tracks "Great Expectations", "I Wish", "Notice Me" and "Liberal Education" were first broadcast on the David Jensen show on 17 July 1983. The tracks "Smalltown England", "Spirit of the Falklands", "Christian Militia" and "Running in the Rain" were first broadcast on the John Peel show on 14 December 1983. "The Cause" was an unreleased demo. The tracks "Drag it Down", "Frightened" and "The Attack" were first broadcast on the Janice Long show on 30 December 1984.

The album was first released on LP and CD in June 1988. In 1997 the CD version was packaged together with the album Vengeance (1984) as a limited edition double CD with a picture disc and titled Small Town England. The album was reissued on its own on CD in 2002.

Track listing
All tracks written by Justin Sullivan and Stuart Morrow except where otherwise noted.

"Great Expectations" – 3:04
"I Wish" – 3:55
"Notice Me" – 2:40
"Liberal Education" – 4:51
"Smalltown England" – 3:23
"Spirit of the Falklands" – 3:54
"Christian Militia" – 3:39
"Running in the Rain" (Sullivan) – 4:19
"The Cause" (Sullivan) – 4:08
"Drag it Down" (Sullivan, Robert Heaton, Morrow) – 3:36
"Frightened" – 3:47
"The Attack" (Sullivan) – 3:24

Personnel

Production
Dale Griffin – producer ("Great Expectations", "I Wish", "Notice Me", "Liberal Education")
Roger Pusey – producer ("Smalltown England", "Spirit of the Falklands", "Christian Militia", "Running in the Rain")
New Model Army – producer ("The Cause")
Mike Eagles – engineer ("Great Expectations", "I Wish", "Notice Me", "Liberal Education")
Harry Parker – engineer ("Smalltown England", "Spirit of the Falklands", "Christian Militia", "Running in the Rain")

Musicians
Justin Sullivan – vocals, guitar
Stuart Morrow – bass, vocals
Robert Heaton – drums

References

BBC Radio recordings
New Model Army (band) compilation albums
New Model Army (band) live albums
1988 live albums
1988 compilation albums